Nabatieh Fawka, also known as Upper Nabatieh is a Lebanese village in the Nabatieh Governorate.

History
In  the 1596 tax records in the early Ottoman era, it was named as a village,  Nabatiyya al-Fawqa, in the  nahiya (subdistrict) of  Sagif   under the liwa' (district) of Safad. It had a population of  104 households and 25 bachelors, all Muslim. The villagers paid 2,200 akçe in taxes on olive trees, 450 for "occasional revenues", 602 on goats and bee hives, 30 for an olive oil press, or a press for grape syrup, and 5000 as a fixed amount; a total of 8,276  akçe.

In 1875, Victor Guérin described the village as being located on a hill, and having 500 Métualis inhabitants. It was surrounded by gardens planted with fig trees.

On 16 April 1996, Israeli warplanes bombed an apartment in Nabatieh Fawka, killing nine people, seven of whom were children.

References

Bibliography

External links
Nabatiyeh El Faouqa, localiban.org

Populated places in Nabatieh District
Shia Muslim communities in Lebanon